The 2018–19 UMBC Retrievers men's basketball team represented the University of Maryland, Baltimore County in the 2018–19 NCAA Division I men's basketball season. They played their home games at the UMBC Event Center in Catonsville, Maryland, with one game being played at their former home, the Retriever Activities Center, and were led by third-year head coach Ryan Odom. They were members of the America East Conference. They finished the season 21–13, 11–5 in America East play to finish in third place. They defeated Albany and Hartford to advance to the championship game of the America East tournament where they lost to Vermont. Despite having 21 wins, they did not participate in a postseason tournament.

Previous season
The Retrievers finished the 2017–18 season 25–11, 12–4 in the America East Conference play to finish in second place. In the America East tournament, they beat UMass Lowell and Hartford to advance to the championship, where they defeated Vermont. As a result, the Retrievers received the conference's automatic bid to the NCAA tournament. As the No. 16 seed in the South region, they defeated the No. 1 overall seed Virginia by 20 points, becoming the first 16th-seeded team to beat a No. 1 seed. The win is considered either the biggest, or second-biggest, upset in NCAA Tournament history depending on seedings or point spreads. The Retrievers lost to Kansas State in the second round.

Roster

Schedule and results

|-
!colspan=12 style=| Non-conference regular season

|-
!colspan=9 style=| America East Conference regular season

|-
!colspan=12 style=| America East tournament
|-

|-

Source

References

UMBC Retrievers men's basketball seasons
UMBC Retrievers
UMBC
UMBC